Adley Creek is a stream in Stearns County, in the U.S. state of Minnesota.

Adley Creek was named for Warren Adley, an early settler and state legislator.

See also
List of rivers of Minnesota

References

Rivers of Stearns County, Minnesota
Rivers of Minnesota